Macrides, Makrides, Macridis, Makridis are transcriptions of the  Greek surname Μακρίδης. Notable people with the surname include:

Macrides 
 Demetrios A. Macrides, Commissioner of the Scouts of Greece
 Ruth Macrides (1949-2019), Centre for Byzantine, Ottoman and Modern Greek Studies, University of Birmingham

Makrides 
 Constantinos Makrides (born 1982), Cypriot football player
 Maria Makrides, Australian academic, paediatrician and nutritionist

Makridis
 Alexandros Makridis, former president  (1963–66) of the AEK Athens Football Club
Babis Makridis ( Μπάμπης Μακρίδης), Greek film director
Charalambos Makridis, Greek-German footballer
, Greek resistance fighter,  one of ELAS chief staff officers
Theodoros Makridis (Θεόδωρος Μακρίδης), known as  Theodore Makridi (1872–1940), Ottoman and Turkish - Greek archaeologist 
Vasilios Makridis (born 1939),  Greek alpine skier

Greek-language surnames

el:Μακρίδης